Jacqueline Lichtenstein (1947 – 3 April 2019) was a French philosopher, art historian, and professor of aesthetics and the philosophy of art at the University of Paris IV - Paris-Sorbonne.

Her work focused on 17th century- and 18th-century art, and the ways in which people think, talk, and theorize about art. Another theme of her work was the shift, since the 17th century, in how people think about the amateur.

Career 

Lichtenstein taught at the University of California at Berkeley, the University of Paris X-Nanterre, and at the University of Paris IV - Paris-Sorbonne, among other places. She published numerous articles in French and American journals.

She was the joint director of a philosophy and sociology training and research unit at University Paris IV-Sorbonne, where she coordinated a master’s program in aesthetics and philosophy of art. She was also in charge of the series "Essays on art and philosophy" (Aesthetics and philosophy of art), founded by Henri Gouhier in 1949 and published by Editions Vrin.

The eloquence of color 

A central theme of Lichtenstein's work is the reception of color by various disciplines, such as philosophy, art, sociology, and ethics. A focal point for her analysis was the antagonistic relationship between color and the notion of the design or plan of a work (in 17th-century French, the dessein of the work, etymologically related to dessin, drawing).

Philosophically suspect due to its material character, morally culpable because of its seductive luster, color, in Lichtenstein's view, has long been deemed aesthetically dangerous, the source of a pleasure and a beauty that does not, at first blush, seem connected with the True and the Good. This is, she argued, one aspect of an ongoing conflict between reason and the universe of sensible forms. Painting not being reducible to drawing, it is a source of disunity and disorder in our systems of knowledge, one which elicits an experience of "lack" (insuffisance).

The history of this conflict, she argued, begins in Platonic thought, which condemns color and rhetoric equally. The arts of speech and those of imagery are thus definitively linked. A central later figure is Roger de Piles, the leader of the Rubenists, the partisans of color (coloris). The Rubenists broke with the Platonic tradition and defended illusion, makeup, and seduction. They shifted, Lichtenstein maintained, the focus to those feminine aspects of representation, that is the suspected and cursed elements. They made these the essence of painting.

From that point onward, painting was linked with the linguistically inexpressible. Only the gaze may be spoken of, not the picture itself. This, argued Lichtenstein, was the birth of aesthetics, in the sense that the word was to take on in the 17th century.

Publications 
 La couleur éloquente, rhétorique et peinture à l'âge classique, Flammarion, Paris, 1989.
 La tâche aveugle : Essai sur les relations de la peinture et de la sculpture à l'âge moderne, NRF Essais, Paris, 2003.
Collected works 
 La peinture, Larousse, Paris, 1995.
 Tadanori Yokoo, co-authored with Daido Moriyama and Takayo Iida, Actes Sud, 2006.
 Conférences de l'Académie royale de Peinture et de Sculpture : tome 1, volume 1, Les Conférences au temps d'Henry Testelin 1648-1681, ENSBA, Paris, 2007.
 Conférences de l'Académie royale de Peinture et de Sculpture : tome 1, volume 2 : 1648-1681, ENSBA, Paris, 2007.

References

External links 

 Unit for training and research in philosophy and sociology at the University Paris IV-Sorbonne.
 La comparaison des arts of Jacqueline Lichtenstein, in Vocabulaire européen des philosophies : dictionnaire des intraduisibles, dir. Barbara Cassin, Seuil, Dictionnaires le Robert, 2004 
 Records in the university system documentation, Paris.

1947 births
2019 deaths
20th-century French philosophers
21st-century French writers
21st-century French women writers
21st-century French philosophers
French art historians
Philosophers of art
French women philosophers
Women art historians
French women historians
20th-century French women